Gogi Topadze (born April 18, 1940, Tbilisi) is a Georgian politician and scientist who is the founder and head of the Industry Will Save Georgia party.

Biography
In 1957 Topadze graduated from high school and continued his studies at the Polytechnic Institute of Food and chemical technologies. In 1962, he graduated as a researcher. In 1967 Topadze studied organic chemistry in Moscow. In 1969 he received his graduate degree.

References

External links
Rferl

1940 births
Politicians from Georgia (country)
Living people